Dhanda is a village in Rurka Kalan tehsil in Jalandhar district of Punjab State, India. The village is administrated by a sarpanch who is an elected representative of village as per Panchayati raj.

Education 
The village has a Punjabi medium, co-ed upper primary school (GMS Dhanda). The school provides mid-day meal as per Indian Midday Meal Scheme, and the meal prepared in school premises. It was found in 1981.

Demography 
According to the report published by Census India in 2011, Dhanda has 343 houses and population of 1612, 838 males and 774 females. The literacy rate of Dhanda is 78.16%, higher than state average of 75.84%. The population of children under the age of 6 years is 147, which is 9.12% of total population of Dhanda, and child sex ratio is approximately 815 females per 1000 males, lower than state average of 846.

As per census 2011, 583 people were engaged in work activities out of the total population of Dhanda, which includes 486 males and 97 females. According to census survey report 2011, 93.14% workers describe their work as main work and 6.86% workers are involved in marginal activity providing livelihood for less than 6 months.

Transport 

References 

Villages in Jalandhar district